Human rights is an issue in Guatemala. The establishment of the International Commission against Impunity in Guatemala has helped the Attorney General prosecute extrajudicial killings and corruption. There remains widespread impunity for abusers from the Guatemalan Civil War, which ran from 1960 to 1996, and Human Rights Watch considers threats and violence against unionists, journalists and lawyers a major concern.

A trial for eight former Army members on charges related to the alleged disappearances of 130 people whose bodies were found among 550 at a base now run by the UN called CREOMPAZ has been stalled since it began in 2016 due to witness intimidation, among other factors.

History 
After an ongoing civil war which lasted over 36 years in Guatemala, the country began to transition into a more stable and established democratic country. However, following the civil war, corruption began to appear all over the country and it eventually engulfed the whole country in common crimes and chaos. In 2013, the crime rate increased to where there was roughly 6,000 homicides per year in Guatemala. These violent killings included deaths of women and children. While Guatemala was fighting toward ending the corruption, there were many high-level government officials who were involved in organized crime. This resulted in only about 2% of the violent crimes going to trial. In 2015, President Otto Pérez Molina, Vice President Roxana Baldetti, and other high officials lost their power and were prosecuted for participation in human rights violation. Montt was convicted of the charges of genocide and was sentenced to 80–85 years in jail but this was soon over turned 10 days later. During his second trial Efrain Rios Montt died on April 1, 2018 at the age of 91.

Solutions 
International Commission against Impunity in Guatemala organization was first established on December 12, 2005. After years of human rights violation in Guatemala, government officials began leading towards creating an established organization that would investigate the many variety of cases that were left unsolved. After getting the assistance from the United Nations, the government of Guatemala formulated an organization called Commission of Investigation of Illegal Bodies and Clandestine Security Apparatuses (CICIACS). The creation of this organization caused a controversy in Guatemala, which resulted in it being denied because the ruling deemed it to be a violation of the exclusive constitutional delegation of power to the Public Ministry. After being denied the government of Guatemala revised the document and the regulation of the CICIACS to eliminate all the unconstitutional issues that were brought to their attention from the constitutional court. When they were finished they re-introduced the proposition to the court and after the review the Constitutional court approved it. They renamed it International Commission against Impunity in Guatemala (CICIG). The government of Guatemala and the United Nations signed it into order on December 12, 2005.

Legal issues 
According to the International Human Rights Law Group, the Guatemalan criminal justice system is to blame for the poor human rights Guatemala faces. Cerezo announced it would now be their responsibility. The Guatemalan criminal justice system is supposed to work with the court to punish those who violate human rights. With a system implemented to protect human rights in Guatemala the issue of these rights being violated remains. This is partly because the judges are not trained properly which can affect the investigation by causing them to be unreliable. The Commission against Impunity in Guatemala (CICIG) was established in 2007 and itworks to break down corruption within the country. After a CICIG investigation the 2015 president, Cerezo collected bribes he was later arrested. Human rights violations continue to increase with the Guatemalan people as victims because of improper protections from the government.

On 16 May 2022, Alejandro Giammattei reappointed María Consuelo Porras as attorney general, to serve for another four years. The decision posed a serious risk to human rights and the rule of law in the country. During her initial years in office, Porras has undermined investigations into corruption and human rights abuses, and brought arbitrary criminal proceedings against journalists, judges, and prosecutors.

Gender 
Fourteen women were found victims of sexual abuse by two military officers and sentenced to prison. The two officers both have prior criminal history, one with triple homicide with three women and the other is responsible for the disappearance of the husband's to his female victims . In addition, the country's constitution does not protect LGBT rights and a bill proposed in 2017 bans students from learning about other sexual orientations and also bans same sex marriage.

References